The 1975–76 American Basketball Association season saw the defending champion Kentucky Colonels finish in fourth place in the ABA, defeat the Indiana Pacers 2 games to 1 in the first round of the 1976 ABA Playoffs, and lose to the regular season champion Denver Nuggets 4 games to 3 in the ABA Semifinals. The 1975–76 season was the Colonels' ninth and last, as Kentucky was one of two ABA teams left out of the 1976 ABA-NBA merger.

Offseason

Draft picks

Preseason transactions

Prior to the season, ABA Commissioner Dave DeBusschere, urged on by Colonels owner John Y. Brown, Jr., challenged the NBA to a world championship series between the ABA champion Kentucky Colonels and NBA champion Golden State Warriors in which the winner would get $1 million.  NBA Commissioner Walter Kennedy promptly declined.

Star center Dan Issel was sold to the Baltimore Claws for $500,000, and soon ended up with the Denver Nuggets.

Gene Rhodes was named Vice President of Operations and David Vance was named General Manager.

Preseason exhibition games

Like most ABA teams, the Colonels played several preseason exhibition games against NBA opponents.  The Colonels opened up the season's ABA vs. NBA action on October 1, 1975, in Cincinnati, Ohio, against the NBA's Chicago Bulls.  The Colonels beat the Bulls 95-86.

Three nights later on October 4, 1975, the Colonels met the NBA's New York Knicks at the Capital Centre in Landover, Maryland.  Louie Dampier scored 23 for the Colonels but New York's Earl Monroe led all scorers with 26 as the Knicks won 107-102.

The next night the Colonels returned to Cincinnati to host the Detroit Pistons.  Bob Lanier led the Pistons with 17 points but Artis Gilmore had 22 and Travis Grant added 17 and the game winning score, a jump shot with 4 seconds left in game, to lead Kentucky to a 114-113 victory.

On October 8, 1975, the reigning champions of the ABA and NBA met at Freedom Hall in Louisville.  8,806 fans turned out to see the Golden State Warriors face the Colonels.  Marv Roberts scored 20 points and former ABA player Rick Barry was held to 9 points on 3 of 11 shooting from the floor, including an airball with 31 seconds left in the game.  Artis Gilmore had 14 points and 11 rebounds to lead the Colonels to a 93-90 victory against the NBA champions.

Two nights later on October 10, 1975, the NBA's Milwaukee Bucks visited Louisville and lost to the Colonels 96-91.

On October 12, 1975, the Kentucky Colonels traveled to Michigan to face the Detroit Pistons again.  The game went to overtime.  Despite Bird Averitt's 21 points the Pistons won the overtime game, 115-107.

Two nights later on October 14, 1975, the NBA's Buffalo Braves came to Louisville and were defeated by the Colonels, 120-116.

On October 17, 1975, the Philadelphia 76ers traveled to Cincinnati to face the Colonels.  Former ABA player George McGinnis had 25 points but so did Artis Gilmore.  Kentucky won, 112-110.

Two nights later on October 19, 1975, the Colonels hosted the Washington Bullets in Lexington, Kentucky.  Led by Artis Gilmore's 23 points, the Colonels won 121-111.  This was the penultimate ABA-NBA matchup; two nights later in Salt Lake City, Utah, the Milwaukee Bucks lost to the Utah Stars 106-101.

Overall in the 1975-76 preseason the ABA went 30-18 against NBA teams.

Regular season

Roster

 5   Jan Van Breda Kolff
 10  Louie Dampier
 14  Bird Averitt
 20  Allen Murphy
 21  Jimmy Dan Connor
 22  Wil Jones
 25  Maurice Lucas
 31  Johnny Neumann
 32  Jimmy Baker
 42  Ron Thomas
 43  Kevin Joyce
 45  Jim McDaniels
 53  Artis Gilmore

Season standings

Game log

|-
||  ||  ||  || || ||  ||
|-

|-
||  ||  ||  || || ||  ||
|-

|-
||  ||  ||  || || ||  ||
|-

|-
||  ||  ||  || || ||  ||
|-
|-

|-
||  ||  ||  || || ||  ||
|-
|-

|-

Month by Month

October 1975

November 1975

December 1975

January 1976

February 1976

March 1976

Playoffs
Quarterfinals

Colonels win series, 2–1

Semifinals

Nuggets win series, 4–3

Player statistics

Legend

Season

Playoffs

Awards and records

Awards

 Artis Gilmore, 1976 ABA All-Star Game
 Artis Gilmore, All-ABA First Team
 Artis Gilmore, ABA All-Defensive Team

Records

On December 18, 1975, the Colonels had their smallest crowd ever, 2,761, for a 115-102 loss to the San Antonio Spurs.

On April 28, 1976, the Colonels were the opponent, in the ABA Semifinals, when the Denver Nuggets set their franchise's attendance record, with 18,821 present for the Nuggets' 133-110 win in Game 7.

Transactions

 Dan Issel sold to Baltimore Claws for $500,000, preseason
 Caldwell Jones purchased from the San Diego Sails, November 14, 1975
 Caldwell Jones traded to the Spirits of St. Louis for Maurice Lucas, December 17, 1975
 Marv Roberts traded to the Virginia Squires for Johnny Neumann and Jan van Breda Kolff, January 17, 1976
 Teddy McClain sold to the New York Nets for $150,000, February 15, 1976

Aftermath
With the conclusion of the 1975–76 ABA season, negotiations to finalize the ABA-NBA merger began. On June 17, 1976 Colonels owner John Y. Brown, Jr. agreed to fold the Colonels in exchange for $3 million from the ABA teams entering the NBA.  The Colonels' players were put into a dispersal draft along with the players from the Spirits of St. Louis.  The Chicago Bulls took Artis Gilmore for $1.1 million; the Portland Trail Blazers took Maurice Lucas for $300,000; the  Buffalo Braves took Bird Averitt for $125,000; the Indiana Pacers took Wil Jones for $50,000; the New York Nets took Jan Van Breda Kolff for $60,000 and the San Antonio Spurs took Louie Dampier for $20,000.  Brown took the money he received for the Colonels and used part of it to purchase the NBA's Buffalo Braves, which he later parlayed into ownership of the Boston Celtics.

References

 Colonels on Basketball Reference

External links 
 RememberTheABA.com 1975-76 regular season and playoff results
 RememberTheABA.com Kentucky Colonels page
 RememberTheABA.com 1975-76 game by game results

Kentucky
Kentucky Colonels seasons
Kentucky Colonels, 1975-76
Kentucky Colonels, 1975-76